Ulrik Lund Andersen (born 1972 in Ikast) is a Danish physicist and professor of physics at the Department of Physics at the Technical University of Denmark (DTU), who researches quantum optics and quantum networks.

He went to Ikast-Brande Gymnasium high school.  He received a Master of Science in physics from DTU in 1999 and a Ph.D. from DTU in 2003. He worked at the University of Erlangen–Nuremberg in Germany from 2003-2006, and was then employed as an associate professor at DTU. In 2012, he was appointed professor and section leader at DTU Physics.

In 2013, Andersen received the EliteForsk Prize in recognition of his work on quantum optics.

References

External links

1972 births
Living people
21st-century Danish physicists
Academic staff of the Technical University of Denmark
Technical University of Denmark alumni
Academic staff of the University of Erlangen-Nuremberg
People from Ikast-Brande Municipality